Quatre études, pour orchestre is a collection of arrangements of works by Russian composer Igor Stravinsky. This composition was finished in 1928 and premiered in Berlin in 1930 by Ernest Ansermet. It was revised afterwards in 1952.

Structure 

This composition is an arrangement for orchestra of two of Stravinsky's previous works: Three Pieces for String Quartet (1914) and Étude pour pianola (1921). The movements are placed in this order and all titles were changed. A typical performance of this work lasts nine minutes. The movement list is as follows:

Notable recordings 

Notable recordings of this composition include:

References 

Compositions by Igor Stravinsky
1928 compositions
Compositions for symphony orchestra